The Almirante Cervera class (or Alfonso class) were three light cruisers built for the Spanish Navy in the 1920s. The ships were built by Sociedad Española de Construcción Naval in Ferrol which had strong British links and were designed by Sir Philip Watts. The design was based on the British , but had all boilers grouped together reducing the number of funnels to two. The main armament comprised Vickers pattern 6-inch guns with single mountings in "A" and "Y" positions and twin turrets in "B", "Q" and "X" positions. The programme was initially authorised in 1915 but was delayed by World War I with construction of the first ship starting in 1917.

Galicia and Miguel de Cervantes had substantial refits in the 1940s. The 6-inch turret in "Q" position was replaced by a catapult for a seaplane and the single 6-inch mountings were replaced by twins to retain an 8 gun broadside. Extra AA guns were fitted in all three ships.

Ships

Service history
Principe Alfonso conveyed King Alfonso XIII on several foreign tours in the late 1920s and in 1931 took him to exile in Italy. During the Spanish Civil War, renamed Libertad, she served in the Spanish Republican Navy and was interned in Bizerte, French Tunisia, at the end of the conflict. She returned to Spain in 1939 and was renamed Galicia. The ship was interned in Bizerte and returned to Spain. She was badly damaged by fire in 1943 and repaired. She represented Spain in the Coronation Fleet Review in 1953. Almirante Cervera (named after Admiral Pascual Cervera y Topete) served on the Nationalist side in the civil war and was present in most of the major battles.

References

Bibliography

External links

 Buques De Guerra, a Spanish website about warships 

Cruiser classes